Antoine Pierre Lucien Bangels (2 January 1899 – 20 December 1951) was a Belgian middle-distance runner. He competed in the men's 1500 metres at the 1920 Summer Olympics. He died in a railway accident.

References

External links
 

1899 births
1951 deaths
People from Landen
Sportspeople from Flemish Brabant
Athletes (track and field) at the 1920 Summer Olympics
Belgian male middle-distance runners
Olympic athletes of Belgium
Place of birth missing
Railway accident deaths in Belgium
20th-century Belgian people